Kadek Arel Priyatna (born on 4 April 2005) is an Indonesian professional footballer who plays as a centre-back for Liga 1 club Bali United.

Career

Bali United
On 12 January 2023, Arel officially signed a contract with Bali United. He made his official debut against Persita in the  2022–23 Liga 1.

Career statistics

Club

Honours
Bali United U-18
 Elite Pro Academy Liga 1 U-18: 2021
Indonesia U-16
 AFF U-16 Youth Championship third place: 2019

References

External links
Kadek Arel Priyatna at PSSI Official Website

2005 births
Living people
People from Denpasar
Indonesian footballers
Liga 1 (Indonesia) players
Association football midfielders
Sportspeople from Bali
Bali United F.C. players
Balinese people
Indonesia youth international footballers